The 2023 Cross River State gubernatorial election will take place on 18 March 2023, to elect the Governor of Cross River State, concurrent with elections to the Cross River State House of Assembly as well as twenty-seven other gubernatorial elections and elections to all other state houses of assembly. The election—which was postponed from its original 11 March date—will be held three weeks after the presidential election and National Assembly elections. Incumbent APC Governor Benedict Ayade is term-limited and cannot seek re-election to a third term.

Party primaries were scheduled for between 4 April and 9 June 2022 with the Peoples Democratic Party nominating  Senator for Cross River Central Sandy Ojang Onor on 25 May while the All Progressives Congress nominated former Senator for Cross River South Bassey Otu on 26 May.

Electoral system
The governor of Cross River State is elected using a modified two-round system. To be elected in the first round, a candidate must receive the plurality of the vote and over 25% of the vote in at least two-thirds of state local government areas. If no candidate passes this threshold, a second round will be held between the top candidate and the next candidate to have received a plurality of votes in the highest number of local government areas.

Background
Cross River State is a diverse state in the South South with growing economy and vast natural areas but facing an underdeveloped yet vital agricultural sector, deforestation, and rising debt in large part due to years of systemic corruption.

Politically, the state's 2019 elections were categorized as a continuation of the PDP's control as Ayade won with over 73% of the vote and the party won every seat in the House of Assembly along with all three senate seats. However, the PDP did lose one House of Representatives seat to the APC and although the state was easily won by PDP presidential nominee Atiku Abubakar, it still swung towards Buhari compared to 2015 and had lower turnout. In the interim between 2019 and 2023, the state's political landscape drastically changed as Ayade defecting to the APC in May 2021 set in motion a wave of other defections that gave the APC control of the House of Assembly and half of the eight House of Representatives seats by mid-2022.

Ahead of his second term, Ayade stated focuses included the completion of in-progress projects and industrialization; however, he was routinely criticized for authoritarian-esque actions. Alarms were raised after Ayade's defection when he withheld the salaries of state and local officeholders that refused to defect with him and forcibly converted the state PDP secretariat into the new APC headquarters but the allegations of dictatorial actions were at their peak around his ordered arrests and months-long imprisonments of a critic and a journalist. At other points during his administration, Ayade was given praise for allocating large parts of the budget to capital expenditures while receiving further criticism for covering up COVID-19 cases, abandoning in-progress projects for new potential white elephants like the Calas Vegas resort project and the new Obudu Airport, creating several new ministries and appointing dozens of aides, getting an unapproved foreign loan in secret without evidence of use for the money, and continuing efforts to build a six-lane superhighway through the ecologically vital Cross River National Park.

Primary elections
The primaries, along with any potential challenges to primary results, were to take place between 4 April and 3 June 2022 but the deadline was extended to 9 June. An informal zoning gentlemen's agreement set the Cross River South Senatorial District to have the next governor as Cross River South has not held the governorship since 2007. Neither major party closed their primaries to non-South candidates, as both the APC and PDP had heated internal debates over zoning to the Southern district. While the APC ended up nominating someone from the South, the PDP chose someone from the Central district.

All Progressives Congress 
Arguments over zoning divided the state APC ahead of the primary as Ayade publicly advocated for his successor to come from the South while prospective candidates from other regions like former Senator John Owan Enoh and former minister Usani Uguru Usani argued for the primary to be kept open. In April 2022, state party chairman Alphonsus Eba stated that the primary would be kept open to candidates from all parts of the state, insisting that Ayade's view was simply his personal opinion. However, in early May, Eba announced a party committee to narrow the number of candidates from 17 to four—as two candidates were to be from the South and two candidates were to be from the Central, the party nomination was effectively zoned to the Central and Southern districts. Though, this arrangement was also scrapped amid internal turmoil that led the party to choose a single informal "consensus" candidate—former Senator Bassey Otu. However, fellow candidates Chris Agara and John Owan Enoh rejected the arrangement and continued their campaigns while Usani left the party to run under the PRP. The apparent final blow to the "consensus" arrangement was Otu's reported disqualification from contesting the primary as it was reported on 20 May that the APC screening panel barred Otu due to his questionable educational qualifications and a fraud conviction from 1987. However, the panel announced that it had not disqualified Otu but preliminarily declared his case "inconclusive" due to the absence of certain credentials. Then the consensus arrangement received another lifeline as Owan Enoh withdrew and endorsed Otu.

As the consensus arrangement reformed, a number of other candidates dropped out in favor of Oti leading to the primary day, when an indirect primary ended in Otu emerging as the APC nominee after results showed him winning over 84% of the delegates' votes. In his acceptance speech, Otu thanked the party and his former opponents while pledging to continue the work of the Ayade administration. However, controversy emerged afterwards when Owan Enoh surprisingly reversed position and filed an appeal petition against Otu in reference to the dispute over his educational qualifications. Despite the ongoing lawsuit, Otu commenced a general election campaign which was dominated by the search for a running mate in the weeks after the primary, with party members desiring regional balance in the ticket. To achieve this balance, Peter Odey—MHA for Ogoja—was chosen as the deputy gubernatorial nominee on 9 August at an unveiling rally in Ogoja. A Federal High Court ruling dismissed Owan Enoh's lawsuit in late October 2022 with Justice Ijeoma Ojukwu finding that primary candidate qualification screening was the purview of political parties. Initially Owan Enoh appealed the ruling but he announced its withdrawal in December due to personal overtures from APC presidential nominee Bola Tinubu.

Nominated 
 Bassey Otu: 2019 APC Cross River South senatorial nominee, former Senator for Cross River South (2011–2015), and former House of Representatives member for Calabar Municipal/Odukpani (2003–2011)
 Running mate—Peter Odey: House of Assembly member for Ogoja

Eliminated in primary 
 Chris Agara: businessman

Withdrew 
 Ben Akak: businessman
 Asuquo Ekpenyong: Commissioner for Finance
 Bassey Ndem: former Commissioner for Lands
 Godswill Edward Osim: Governor Benedict Ayade aide and son-in-law of former President Goodluck Jonathan
 John Owan Enoh: former Senator for Cross River Central (2015–2019) and 2019 APC gubernatorial nominee
 Usani Uguru Usani: former Minister for Niger Delta Affairs (2015–2019), 2019 APC gubernatorial candidate, Cross River State APC Chairman (2014–2015), 2012 ACN gubernatorial nominee, and former commissioner (defected prior to the primary to successfully run in the PRP gubernatorial primary)

Declined 
 Goddy Jedy Agba: Minister of State for Power (2019–present)
 Okonkon Effiom: Commissioner for Rural Transformation
 Edem Effiom Ekong: Governor Ayade aide, former Commissioner for Local Government Affairs, and former Commissioner for Lands
 Hilliard Eta: former National APC Vice Chairman
 Eyo Etim Nyong: physician and former member of the board of the Niger Delta Development Commission

Results

People's Democratic Party 
Ahead of the primary, rumours that former Governor Donald Duke was attempting to impose Arthur Jarvis Archibong as the party nominee led to protests from other candidates. When Duke held a meeting to find an informal "consensus" Southern candidate in early May 2022, Archibong emerged as the choice leading to further accusations of imposition as other candidates rejected the arrangement.

On the primary date, the election ended with Senator Sandy Ojang Onor emerging as the PDP nominee after results showed him winning by a margin of about 10%. Runner-up Gershom Bassey accepted the results and congratulated Onor while noting that Southern candidates got a majority of votes cast. On 4 July, Onor announced Emana Ambrose-Amawhe—a former Channels TV presenter—as his running mate in a speech that pointed out that Ambrose-Amawhe would become Cross River's first women deputy governor in 30 years.

Nominated 
 Sandy Ojang Onor: Senator for Cross River Central (2019–present), former Commissioner for Environment (2012–2013), former Commissioner for Agriculture (2010–2011), and former Etung Local Government Chairman (1999–2002)
 Running mate—Emana Ambrose-Amawhe: former news presenter

Eliminated in primary 
 Arthur Jarvis Archibong: Chancellor of Arthur Jarvis University
 Daniel Effiong Asuquo: House of Representatives member for Akamkpa/Biase (2011–present), former Director-General of the Cross River State Electrification Agency (2008–2010), and former Akamkpa Local Government Chairman (1999–2002)
 Gershom Bassey: Senator for Cross River South (2015–present) and former Chairman of the Cross River State Water Board (1999–2014)
 Mkpang Coco-Bassey: engineer
 Eyo Ekpo-Ene
 Philia Henshaw
 Imah Nsa Adegoke: 2012 LP gubernatorial nominee
 Nkoyo Toyo: former House of Representatives member for Calabar Municipal/Odukpani

Withdrew 
 Wilfred Bonse: businessman
 Efiok Cobham: former Deputy Governor

Declined 
 Essien Ekpenyong Ayi: House of Representatives member for Akpabuyo/Bakassi/Calabar South (2003–present) and former Calabar South Local Government Chairman (1995–2002)
 Ita Ekpeyong: former Director of the State Security Service (2010–2015)
 Ntufam Ekpo Okon: 2019 APC deputy gubernatorial nominee and former House of Representatives member for Calabar Municipal/Odukpani

Results

Minor parties 

 Effiom Effiom Ekeng (Action Alliance)
Running mate: Oguda Epam Obongha
 Marikana Stanley Ibiang (Action Democratic Party)
Running mate: Francis Ayi Ukpanyang
 Edet Effiom (Action Peoples Party)
Running mate: Major Umoh Lewis
 Effa Effiong Nyong (African Democratic Congress)
Running mate: Christabel Mfam Kasang
 Ogar Obu (Labour Party)
Running mate: Ekpezu Obu Ekpezu
 Patrick Henry Solomon (National Rescue Movement)
Running mate: Mathias Amagbah
 Usani Uguru Usani (People's Redemption Party)
Running mate: Arit Bassey Nsan
 Edet Okokon (Social Democratic Party)
Running mate: Obo Daniel
 Joseph Coco-Bassey (Young Progressives Party)
Running mate: Prince Agbor Onyi

Campaign
As the general election campaign began in June 2022, pundits focused on the major candidates' attempts to reconcile aggrieved members of their own parties in the wake of the party primaries. While Otu's qualifications were disputed by his intraparty opponents, the catalyst for internal anti-Onor sentiment within the PDP was his disregard for the zoning principle by running. At the commencement of the official campaign period in October, analysts again reiterated the significance of zoning as a campaign issue with the potential that an Onor victory could mean the end of the practice in the state's gubernatorial elections; observers also noted Ayade's support of Otu and Onor's strong oratory skills as further campaign factors. However, the national PDP crisis between the G5 group and the party presidential nominee Atiku Abubakar impacted the Cross River PDP as well, splitting it between G5-aligned and Abubakar-aligned blocs. Onor and the state party chairman led the G5-aligned bloc while the Abubakar-aligned faction was helmed by former Governor Liyel Imoke; by January 2023, observers noted that Onor advertising did not jointly support Abubakar while Abubakar advertising did not mention Onor's gubernatorial candidacy. The next month, focus switched to the presidential election on 25 February. In the election, Cross River State voted for Peter Obi (LP); Obi won the state with 43.2% of the vote, beating Bola Tinubu (APC) at 31.3% and Atiku Abubakar (PDP) at 22.9%. In the wake of the presidential race, pundits focused on regional differences in the gubernatorial election in addition to the rise of minor candidates and Ayade's senatorial loss.

Projections

Conduct

Electoral timetable

General election

Results

By senatorial district 
The results of the election by senatorial district.

By federal constituency
The results of the election by federal constituency.

By local government area 
The results of the election by local government area.

See also 
 2023 Nigerian elections
 2023 Nigerian gubernatorial elections

Notes

References 

Cross River State gubernatorial election
2023
2023 Cross River State elections
Cross River